György Orth (30 April 1901 – 11 January 1962) was a Hungarian football player and manager. As well as being involved in football in his homeland, he also managed in Italy, Chile, Germany, Mexico, Peru, Argentina and Portugal. One of best footballers of his generation, György Orth was an attacking midfielder and forward renowned for his technique and pace. He also played in the football tournament at the 1924 Summer Olympics.

Playing career
Orth started his playing career off with hometown side Vasas, before first experiencing Italian football with a spell at Pisa. Before retirement from playing Orth returned to Budapest in the form of a move to MTK Budapest. He was an important player for the Hungary national team in the interwar era but a serious knee injury suffered in 1926 stymied his playing career.

References

1901 births
1962 deaths
Sportspeople from Budapest
Hungarian people of German descent
Association football midfielders
Association football forwards
Hungarian footballers
Vasas SC players
Pisa S.C. players
MTK Budapest FC players
First Vienna FC players
Olympique de Marseille players
Hungary international footballers
Olympic footballers of Hungary
Footballers at the 1924 Summer Olympics
1930 FIFA World Cup managers
Hungarian football managers
Chile national football team managers
Colo-Colo managers
FC Metz managers
Mexico national football team managers
Peru national football team managers
San Lorenzo de Almagro managers
Genoa C.F.C. managers
FC Porto managers
A.C.R. Messina managers
Pisa S.C. managers
1. FC Nürnberg managers
Rosario Central managers
Catania S.S.D. managers
C.D. Guadalajara managers
Club Necaxa managers
Expatriate football managers in Chile
Expatriate football managers in France
Expatriate football managers in Germany
Expatriate football managers in Italy
Expatriate football managers in Mexico
Expatriate football managers in Peru
Expatriate football managers in Portugal
Hungarian expatriate football managers
Hungarian expatriate sportspeople in Chile
Hungarian expatriate sportspeople in France
Hungarian expatriate sportspeople in Germany
Hungarian expatriate sportspeople in Italy
Hungarian expatriate sportspeople in Mexico
Hungarian expatriate sportspeople in Peru
Hungarian expatriate sportspeople in Portugal
Magallanes managers